Sanda Belgyan (born 17 December 1992) is a Romanian athlete specialising in the 400 metres and 400 metres hurdles. She competed in the 4 × 400 metres relay at the 2013 and 2015 World Championships reaching the final on the first occasion.

International competitions

Personal bests
Outdoor
400 metres – 52.47 (Bucharest 2012)
400 metres hurdles – 58.13 (Stara Zagora 2013)

Indoor
400 metres – 54.49 (Istanbul 2014)

References

External links
 

1992 births
Living people
Romanian female sprinters
Romanian female hurdlers
World Athletics Championships athletes for Romania
Place of birth missing (living people)
Universiade medalists in athletics (track and field)
Universiade bronze medalists for Romania
Medalists at the 2017 Summer Universiade
European Games competitors for Romania
Athletes (track and field) at the 2019 European Games
20th-century Romanian women
21st-century Romanian women